is a Japanese professional boxer who has also competed in kickboxing and mixed martial arts.

Career
Debuting as a professional boxer on March 26, 1992 Nishijima compiled a 24–2–1 record, and over the course of his career, won the WBO NABO Cruiserweight title, the OPBF Cruiserweight title and the World Boxing Federation Cruiserweight title. His last boxing bout, a two-round TKO loss to Cecil McKenzie in a California State Cruiserweight title fight, took place on July 10, 2003.

On February 26, 2006 Nishijima debuted in mixed martial arts, at PRIDE 31, taking on Mark Hunt and losing by KO.

Currently Nishijima's record in mixed martial arts is 0–5 with most recent loss to Melvin Manhoef by TKO, took place on December 31, 2007 at K-1 PREMIUM 2007 Dynamite!!.

In 2009 Nishijima competed in two K-1 style kickboxing bouts. He lost to Peter Aerts by KO due to a right leg kick on August 11, 2009 at the K-1 World Grand Prix 2009 in Tokyo Final 16 Qualifying GP. On New Year's Eve 2009 he fought another K-1 style kickboxing bout when he took on Ray Sefo at Dynamite!! 2009 and lost by unanimous decision. He was not allowed to kick during this match, as he was wearing boxing shoes, which ended up giving him a large disadvantage against the Samoan. His kickboxing record is currently 0–2.

In his retirement match, Nishijima defeated Bob Sapp under kickboxing rules at Legend 4 in Kumamoto, Japan on November 17, 2013, although he was not allowed to kick as he chose to wear boxing shoes. He dropped Sapp with a body shot. Sapp stood back up but he finished the business with body shots followed by couple of right hooks.

Professional boxing record

| style="text-align:center;" colspan="8"|24 Wins (15 knockouts, 8 decisions, 1 Disqualification), 2 Losses (1 knockouts, 1 decisions), 1 Draws
|-  style="text-align:center; background:#e3e3e3;"
|  style="border-style:none none solid solid; "|Res.
|  style="border-style:none none solid solid; "|Record
|  style="border-style:none none solid solid; "|Opponent
|  style="border-style:none none solid solid; "|Type
|  style="border-style:none none solid solid; "|Rd.
|  style="border-style:none none solid solid; "|Date
|  style="border-style:none none solid solid; "|Location
|  style="border-style:none none solid solid; "|Notes
|- align=center
|Loss
|24–2-1
|align=left| Cecil McKenzie
|TKO
|2 (10)
|
|align=left| HP Pavilion, San Jose, California
|align=left| California State Cruiserweight Title, Nishijima down twice in the 2nd
|- align=center
|Win
|24–1-1
|align=left| Miguel Aquila
|DQ
|4
|
|align=left| Radisson Hotel, Sacramento, California
|align=left| 
|- align=center
|style="background: #c5d2ea"|Draw
|23–1-1
|align=left| Darren Whitley
|MD
|6 (6) 
|
|align=left| Hilton Hotel, Reno, Nevada
|align=left| 
|- align=center
|Win
|22–1
|align=left| Anthony Moore
|SD
|8 (8) 
|
|align=left| Great Western Forum, Inglewood, California
|align=left| 
|- align=center
|Win
|21–1
|align=left| Ken Hulsey
|KO
|2 (6) 
|
|align=left| Great Western Forum, Inglewood, California
|align=left| 
|- align=center
|Win
|20–1
|align=left| Ulysses Boulware
|KO
|5 (6) 
|
|align=left| Great Western Forum, Inglewood, California
|align=left| 
|- align=center
|Win
|19–1
|align=left| Aljenon DeBose
|KO
|6 
|
|align=left| Great Western Forum, Inglewood, California
|align=left| 
|- align=center
|Win
|18–1
|align=left| Eduardo Ayala
|PTS
|10 (10)  
|
|align=left| Carson, California
|align=left| 
|- align=center
|Win
|17–1
|align=left| Brian LaSpada
|UD
|12 (12)  
|
|align=left| Tropicana Hotel & Casino, Las Vegas, Nevada
|align=left| World Boxing Federation cruiserweight title, LaSpada down in the sixth.
|- align=center 
|Win
|16–1
|align=left| Hussain Shah
|TKO
|9 
|
|align=left| Tokyo, Japan
|align=left| 
|- align=center
|Win
|15–1
|align=left| Peter Kinsella
|TKO
|3 (12)
|
|align=left| Kyoto, Japan
|align=left| vacant OPBF cruiserweight title
|- align=center
|Win
|14–1
|align=left| Todd McPhee
|TKO
|3
|
|align=left| Laughlin, Nevada
|align=left| 
|- align=center
|Win
|13–1
|align=left| Leonardo Aguilar
|UD
|12 (12)
|
|align=left| Great Western Forum, Inglewood, California
|align=left| WBO NABO cruiserweight title
|- align=center
|Win
|12–1
|align=left| Krishna Wainwright
|KO
|9
|
|align=left| Yokohama, Japan
|align=left| 
|- align=center
|Win
|11–1
|align=left| Gary Butler
|KO
|8
|
|align=left| Tokyo, Japan
|align=left| 
|- align=center
|Win
|10–1
|align=left| John Kiser
|SD
|12 (12)
|
|align=left| Burbank, California
|align=left| WBO NABO cruiserweight title
|- align=center
|Win
|9–1
|align=left| Keith McMurray
|PTS
|10 (10)
|
|align=left| Tokyo, Japan
|align=left|
|- align=center
|Win
|8–1
|align=left| Andre Sherrod
|KO
|5
|
|align=left| Osaka, Japan
|align=left|
|- align=center
|Win
|7–1
|align=left| Kennedy McCullough
|PTS
|6 (6)
|
|align=left| Irvine, California
|align=left|
|- align=center
|Win
|6–1
|align=left| Jeon Griffin
|KO
|5
|
|align=left| Tokyo, Japan
|align=left|
|- align=center
|Win
|5–1
|align=left| David Mendez
|TKO
|4 
|
|align=left| Great Western Forum, Inglewood, California
|align=left|
|- align=center|- align=center|- align=center|- align=center|
|- align=center
|Loss
|4–1
|align=left| Ken Milligan
|MD
|4 (4)
|
|align=left| Riviera, Las Vegas, Nevada
|align=left|
|- align=center
|Win
|4–0
|align=left| Derrick Edwards
|KO
|3 (4)
|
|align=left| Riviera, Las Vegas, Nevada
|align=left|
|- align=center
|Win
|3–0
|align=left|  Tim Thomas
|KO
|5
|
|align=left| Tokyo, Japan
|align=left|
|- align=center
|Win
|2–0
|align=left| Public Akihiko
|KO
|3
|
|align=left| Saitama, Japan
|align=left|
|- align=center
|Win
|1–0
|align=left|  Ron Smith
|KO
|3
|
|align=left| Tokyo, Japan
|align=left|
|- align=center

Kickboxing record

|-  style="background:#cfc;"
| 2013-11-17 || Win ||align=left| Bob Sapp || Legend 4 || Kumamoto, Japan || TKO (Punches) || 1 || 2:36
|-  style="background:#fbb;"
| 2009-12-31 || Loss ||align=left| Ray Sefo || Dynamite!! 2009 || Saitama, Japan || Decision (Unanimous) || 3 || 3:00
|-  style="background:#fbb;"
| 2009-08-11 || Loss ||align=left| Peter Aerts || K-1 World Grand Prix 2009 in Tokyo Final 16 Qualifying GP || Tokyo, Japan || KO (Right Low Kick) || 3 || 1:24
|-
| colspan=9 | Legend:

Mixed martial arts record

|-
| Loss
| align=center| 0-5
| Melvin Manhoef
| TKO (punches)
| K-1 Premium 2007 Dynamite!!
| 
| align=center| 1
| align=center| 1:49
| Osaka, Japan
| 
|-
| Loss
| align=center| 0-4
| Phil Baroni
| Technical Submission (kimura)
| PRIDE 32: The Real Deal
| 
| align=center| 1
| align=center| 3:20
| Las Vegas, Nevada, United States
| 
|-
| Loss
| align=center| 0-3
| Evangelista Santos
| Submission (rear-naked choke)
| PRIDE FC: Final Conflict Absolute
| 
| align=center| 1
| align=center| 3:24
| Saitama, Japan
|Middleweight (200 lbs) debut.
|-
| Loss
| align=center| 0-2
| Hidehiko Yoshida
| Submission (triangle choke)
| PRIDE FC: Total Elimination Absolute
| 
| align=center| 1
| align=center| 2:33
| Osaka, Japan
| 
|-
| Loss
| align=center| 0-1
| Mark Hunt
| KO (punch)
| PRIDE 31: Dreamers
| 
| align=center| 3
| align=center| 1:18
| Saitama, Japan
|

References

External links

Living people
Cruiserweight boxers
Japanese male kickboxers
Cruiserweight kickboxers
Japanese male mixed martial artists
Middleweight mixed martial artists
Mixed martial artists utilizing boxing
Mixed martial artists utilizing kickboxing
1973 births
Japanese male boxers
Sportspeople from Saitama (city)